Dorchester West railway station is one of two railway stations serving the town of Dorchester in Dorset, England. The station is managed by Great Western Railway. The line becomes double at the station and remains so to just before nearby Dorchester Junction, where the line joins the South West Main Line from London Waterloo to Weymouth.

History
The station was opened by the Great Western Railway on 20 January 1857, when it completed the former Wilts, Somerset and Weymouth line from Castle Cary and Yeovil through to Weymouth.

In October 2021, a new ramp was opened allowing step-free access to platform 1.

Stationmasters

Peter Leach 1859 - 1860 - 1862 (afterwards station master at Castle Cary)
Edwin Wall from 1860 (formerly station master at Castle Cary)
George Prowse 1864 - 1870 
Henry Maggs 1870 - 1872 (formerly station master at Shepton Mallett, afterwards station master at Didcot)
Henry Yeo 1876 - ca. 1894 (formerly station master at Maiden Newton)
Alfred Reeve 1897 - 1901 (afterwards station master at Warminster)
Jesse Higgs 1901 - 1907 (formerly station master at Warminster, afterwards station master at Trowbridge)
John Charles Neville 1907  - 1910 (formerly station master at Weston-super-Mare)
William Best 1910 - 1917 (formerly station master at Shepton Mallet, afterwards station master at Salisbury)
Thomas Frederick Edwin Jakeman 1917 - 1926 (formerly station master at Didcot, afterwards station master at Westbury)
C.A. Drew 1926 - 1932 (formerly station master at Droitwich)
H.M. Wood 1932 - 1942 (from 1930 also station master of Dorchester South)
John Charles Leach 1942 - 1945 (also in charge of Dorchester South)
S.A. Smith from 1945 (formerly station master at Winchester and Shawford, also in charge of Dorchester South)

Accidents and incidents 
An accident occurred at this station in 1974 when an excursion train from Hereford to Weymouth, on its return journey, did not stop at the signal controlling the entry to the single line section, and ran into the sand drag. The locomotive (a Class 47) ran right through the sand drag and out the other side, followed by a couple of coaches. Eighteen passengers suffered minor injuries in the derailment, but no one was seriously hurt. The passengers were taken home by train via Southampton later that evening, and the loco was subsequently re-railed and recovered during the night several weeks later.

Services 

More frequent services (usually every hour) are available to Weymouth from the nearby Dorchester South station.

See also 

 Ordnance Survey 1937 map of Dorchester showing the location of the two stations

Notes

West
Former Great Western Railway stations
Railway stations in Great Britain opened in 1857
Railway stations served by Great Western Railway
1857 establishments in England
DfT Category F1 stations